Mount Pritchard is a suburb of Sydney, in the state of New South Wales, Australia 34 kilometres south-west of the Sydney central business district, in the local government areas of the City of Fairfield and the City of Liverpool, and is part of the South-western Sydney region.

History 
Mount Pritchard was originally home to the Cabrogal people who occupied much of the greater Fairfield area. In the early 19th century, the land was granted to a number of ex-convicts for farming. Later it was made part of the Male Orphan School Estate. In 1913, land west of Cabramatta Creek and Orange Grove Road previously owned by the Bull family was subdivided into smaller residential lots by a real estate property salesman named Hugh Pritchard, who named it the Cabramatta Park Estate. From 1919, to honour Mr Pritchard's releasing from debt of a number of landowners whom he'd financed, the estate was renamed Mount Pritchard. The local electoral polling place followed suit in 1924. From the early settler days the general area had been known unofficially as Mount Misery, originally because of a story of one of the early settlers and his family camping there whilst travelling, losing their bullocks, and for three weeks remaining in misery until starvation compelled them to beat a retreat, minus bullocks and dray.

Demographics 
At the 2016 Australian census, Mount Pritchard had a population of 9,955. 50.6% of people were born in Australia. The next most common countries of birth were Vietnam 12.7%, Cambodia 2.5%, New Zealand 2.4%, Iraq 2.2% and Lebanon 2.0%. 36.0% of people spoke only English at home. Other languages spoken at home included Vietnamese 19.2%, Arabic 7.6%, Serbian 5.0%, Italian 2.7% and Khmer 2.6%. The most common responses for religion were Catholic 25.7%, Buddhism 16.8% and No Religion 13.5%.

The median household income of $1,191 per week was well below the national average of $1,438 while the average mortgage repayment of $1,883 per month was above the national average of $1,755 placing the suburb firmly in mortgage belt territory.

Transport 
Transit Systems Sydney has three bus route servicing Mount Pritchard:-
 Route 808 from Fairfield to Liverpool.
 Route 815 from Mount Pritchard to Cabramatta.
 Route 816 from Greenfield Park (via Meadows Road, Mount Pritchard) to Cabramatta.

The closest train stations are the Cabramatta, Liverpool and Warwick Farm stations.

Education
Mount Pritchard has two government primary schools: Mount Pritchard Public and Mount Pritchard East Public School. There is also the Les Powell School for students with severe intellectual and multiple disabilities.

Sport and recreation 
The Mounties Club in Meadows Road, Mount Pritchard supports a number of local teams in various sports, including the Mounties rugby league team in the NSW Cup and the Mounties Wanderers in the National Premier Leagues NSW 2.

Mount Pritchard also has an oval, Mount Pritchard Oval, for the rugby league and football team.

Lions Lookout is a scenic spot that features panoramic views of western Sydney, including the Sydney skyline.

References 

Suburbs of Sydney
City of Fairfield
City of Liverpool (New South Wales)